Minuscule 725 (in the Gregory-Aland numbering), ε383 (von Soden), is a Greek minuscule manuscript of the New Testament written on parchment. Palaeographically it has been assigned to the 13th century. The manuscript has complex contents. Scrivener labelled it as 881e.

Description 

The codex contains the text of the four Gospels on 210 parchment leaves (size ).

The text is written in single columns per page, 24-26 lines per page.

There is also a division according to the smaller Ammonian Sections, but without references to the Eusebian Canons.

Text 

The Greek text of the codex is a representative of the Byzantine text-type. Hermann von Soden classified it to the textual family Kx. Aland placed it in Category V.

According to the Claremont Profile Method it represents Kx in Luke 1 and Luke 20. In Luke 10 no profile was made.

In John 8:9 it reads αναγινωσκοντες for ακουσαντες as minuscule 651.

History 

Gregory dated the manuscript to the 13th century. The manuscript is currently dated by the INTF to the 13th century.

It was added to the list of New Testament manuscripts by Scrivener (881) and Gregory (725). Gregory saw the manuscript in 1891.

The manuscript is now housed at the Royal Library of Belgium (11358) in Brussels.

See also 

 List of New Testament minuscules
 Biblical manuscript
 Textual criticism

References

Further reading 

 
 Martin Wittek, Album de paléographie grecque (Ghent, 1967), 24

Greek New Testament minuscules
13th-century biblical manuscripts
Manuscripts in the Royal Library of Belgium